Jean Étienne Kopo Momokoamas is a Central African Republic professional football manager.

Career
Since 2004 until 2006 he coached the Central African Republic national football team. In 2011, he was a head coach of the Olympic Real de Bangui. Since 2013 he worked with the national team as assistant

References

External links
Profile at Footballzz.co.uk

Year of birth missing (living people)
Living people
Central African Republic football managers
Central African Republic national football team managers
Olympic Real de Bangui managers
Place of birth missing (living people)